Leslie Arthur Heber "Les" Slatter (born 22 November 1931) is an English former professional footballer who played as a winger in the Football League for Luton Town and York City, in non-League football for Mount Pleasant YC and Scarborough, in Northern Ireland for Crusaders (scoring 10 goals in his sole season), and was on the books of Aston Villa without making a league appearance.

Slatter made 172 consecutive appearances for Scarborough between 1955 and 1959 in all competitions, which was a club record.

References

1931 births
Living people
Sportspeople from Reading, Berkshire
English footballers
Association football forwards
Luton Town F.C. players
Crusaders F.C. players
Aston Villa F.C. players
York City F.C. players
Scarborough F.C. players
English Football League players
Footballers from Berkshire